The Most Esteemed Family Order of the Crown of Indra of Pahang (Malay: Darjah Kerabat Sri Indera Mahkota Pahang Yang Amat Dihormati) is an honorific order of the Sultanate of Pahang.

History 
Instituted on 25 May 1967, the order is awarded to the Pahang royal family members and members of other royal families in Malaysia. It is also awarded to notable individuals who have excellent contributions to the State, approved by His Majesty the Sultan.

Classes 
It is awarded in two classes:

 Member 1st class (Darjah Kerabat Sri Indera Mahkota Pahang Yang Amat Dihormati Kelas I, post-nominal letters : DK I)
 Member 2nd class (Darjah Kerabat Sri Indera Mahkota Pahang Yang Amat Dihormati Kelas II, post-nominal letters : DK II)

Notable recipients 

 Al-Sultan Abdullah Ri'ayatuddin Al-Mustafa Billah Shah (DK I)
 Tunku Azizah Aminah Maimunah Iskandariah (DK I)
 Abdul Razak Hussein (DK I, 1973)
 Abdullah Ahmad Badawi (DK II, 2006)
 Najib Razak (DK II, 2010)
 Tengku Hassanal Ibrahim Alam Shah (DK I, 2019)
 Sultan Nazrin Muizzuddin Shah (DK I, 2019)
 Sultan Sharafuddin Idris Shah (DK I, 2021)

See also 

 Orders, decorations, and medals of the Malaysian states and federal territories#Pahang
 Orders, decorations, and medals of Pahang
 List of post-nominal letters (Pahang)

References

External links 

 Colecciones Militares (Antonio Prieto Barrio), 

Orders of chivalry of Malaysia
Orders, decorations, and medals of Pahang